Daven Holly (born August 8, 1982) is a former American football cornerback. He played college football at Cincinnati and was drafted by the San Francisco 49ers in the seventh round of the 2005 NFL Draft.

Holly also played for the Chicago Bears and the Cleveland Browns.

Early years
Holly attended Clairton High School where in his senior year made 45 receptions for 900 yards and seven touchdowns.

College career
Holly played college football at the University of Cincinnati. During his time there he played in 49 games making 85 tackles, nine interceptions and one touchdown on defense. He majored in communications.

Professional career

San Francisco 49ers
Holly was selected by the San Francisco 49ers in the seventh round (215th overall) in the 2005 NFL Draft. On September 3, he was waived by the 49ers.

Chicago Bears
Holly was then claimed by the Chicago Bears on September 4. In his rookie season, he played in three games making seven tackles. He made his NFL debut at the Pittsburgh Steelers on December 11. He was waived by Chicago on June 15, 2006.

Cleveland Browns
Holly was signed by the Cleveland Browns as a free agent on July 13. He proved to be a valuable addition to a position that was decimated with injury. In his first season with the Browns he made 14 appearances and 12 starts during which he made 56 tackles and five interceptions which led the team, (one of his interceptions was returned for a touchdown versus the Pittsburgh Steelers on November 19). He also recorded his first fumble for a touchdown against the Tampa Bay Buccaneers on December 24.

In the 2007 season, Holly appeared in 15 games with six starts. He made 47 tackles.

In the 2008 offseason, Holly was tendered a one-year, $2 million contract. Despite tearing two knee ligaments during offseason workouts on May 21, the Browns did not rescind their tender and Holly signed it the day after his injury. He was subsequently waived/injured and reverted to season-ending injured reserve.

External links
Cleveland Browns bio

1982 births
Living people
People from Clairton, Pennsylvania
American football cornerbacks
Players of American football from Pennsylvania
Cincinnati Bearcats football players
San Francisco 49ers players
Chicago Bears players
Cleveland Browns players